The 1932 Monaco Grand Prix was a Grand Prix motor race held at the Circuit de Monaco on 17 April 1932. Tazio Nuvolari, driving for the works Alfa Romeo team, won the race by just 2.8 seconds from the privateer Alfa of Rudolf Caracciola, who, despite having a contract for 1932, was not yet part of the official works team. Caracciola might have had an opportunity to pass Nuvolari for the lead, after the Italian's car developed fuel pick-up issues, but he decided instead to remain behind the Alfa Romeo team leader. The 1931 Monaco Grand Prix runner-up Luigi Fagioli completed the podium in third for the Maserati team.

Entries

 — Divo drove the T53 during the practice sessions on Thursday and Friday, but switched to the T51 for Saturday practice and the race.

Practice
Official timing for practice sessions was introduced for this year.

Thursday

Friday

Saturday

Starting grid
Although practice laps had been officially timed, the grid was still determined by ballot. This was changed for the following year's race.

Classification

Race

References

External links

Monaco
Monaco Grand Prix
Grand Prix